Juan Ulloa Ramírez (February 5, 1935 – February 11, 2017) was a Costa Rican football player, who used to play as a striker.

Club career
Ulloa started his career in 1948 at Third Division side El Carmen de Alajuela and played the majority of his career for hometown club Alajuelense, but also had spells at Puntarenas, San Carlos, Uruguay de Coronado and Orión as well as abroad at Guatemalan side Aurora, in Mexico with León, four months with Real Betis in Spain and Unión Deportiva Canarias in Venezuela.

Ulloa was top scorer of the Primera División three times, in 1959, 1960 and 1966, totalling 140 goals in the Costa Rica Primera División. He scored a record total of 247 goals in all competitions (league, cup, national team and internal club matches).

He retired in 1970.

International career
Ulloa was also part of the Ticos, playing 27 games and scoring 27 goals. He was the national team's all-time goalscorer until Rolando Fonseca surpassed him in 2001. He represented his country in 7 FIFA World Cup qualification matches.

Death
On February 11, 2017, Ulloa was invited to receive a tribute in the Estadio Alejandro Morera Soto before a match between Alajuelense and San Carlos, as he had played for both teams in his career. Former Alajuelense player Pablo Nassar took him back to his house, where Ulloa suffered a cardiorespiratory problem. He was taken to the San Rafael Hospital in Alajuela, where he died.

References

External links
 
 Profile - Alajuelense

1935 births
2017 deaths
People from Alajuela
Association football forwards
Costa Rican footballers
Costa Rica international footballers
L.D. Alajuelense footballers
Aurora F.C. players
Club León footballers
Real Betis players
A.D. San Carlos footballers
Puntarenas F.C. players
Liga FPD players
Costa Rican expatriate footballers
Expatriate footballers in Guatemala
Expatriate footballers in Mexico
Expatriate footballers in Spain
Expatriate footballers in Venezuela